Siejo is one of eight parishes (administrative divisions) in Peñamellera Baja, a municipality within the province and autonomous community of Asturias, in northern Spain. 

The population is 96 (INE 2011).

Parishes in Peñamellera Baja